Psamathe , also known as Neptune X, is a retrograde irregular satellite of Neptune. It is named after Psamathe, one of the Nereids. Psamathe was discovered by Scott S. Sheppard and David C. Jewitt in 2003 using the 8.2 meter Subaru telescope. Before it was officially named on February 3, 2007 (IAUC 8802), it was known by the provisional designation S/2003 N 1.

  
Psamathe is about 38 kilometers in diameter. It orbits Neptune at a distance of between 25.7 and 67.7 million km (for comparison, the Sun-Mercury distance varies between 46 million and 69.8 million km) and requires almost 25 Earth years to make one orbit. The orbit of this satellite is close to the theoretical stable separation from Neptune for a body in a retrograde orbit. Given the similarity of Psamathe's orbital parameters with Neso (S/2002 N 4), it was suggested that both irregular satellites could have a common origin in the break-up of a larger moon. Both are further from their primary than any other known moon in the Solar System.

See also 

 Irregular satellites

References

External links 

 Neptune's Known Satellites (by Scott S. Sheppard)
 S/2003 N1 Neptune Satellite Movie Images (image)
 MPC: Natural Satellites Ephemeris Service
 Mean orbital parameters (NASA)
 IAUC 8193

Moons of Neptune
Irregular satellites
Discoveries by Scott S. Sheppard
Astronomical objects discovered in 2003
Moons with a retrograde orbit